Joseph Berkson (14 May 1899 – 12 September 1982) was trained as a physicist (BSc 1920 College of City of New York, M.A., 1922, Columbia), physician (M.D., 1927, Johns Hopkins), and statistician (Dr.Sc., 1928, Johns Hopkins). He is best known for having identified a source of bias in observational studies caused by selection effects known as Berkson's paradox.

In 1950, as Head (1934–1964) of the Division of Biometry and Medical Statistics of the Mayo Clinic, Rochester, Minnesota, Berkson wrote a key paper entitled Are there two regressions?. In this paper Berkson proposed an error model for regression analysis that contradicted the classical error model until that point assumed to generally apply and this has since been termed the Berkson error model. Whereas the classical error model is statistically independent of the true variable, Berkson's model is statistically independent of the observed variable. Carroll et al. (1995) refer to the two types of error models as follows:
 error models including the Classical Measurement Error models and Error Calibration Models, where the conditional distribution  of W given (Z, X) is modeled — use of such a model is appropriate when attempting to determine X directly, but this is prevented by various errors in measurement.
 regression calibration models (also known as controlled-variable or Berkson error models), where the conditional distribution of X given (Z, W) is modeled.

Berkson is also widely recognised as the key proponent in the use of the logistic in preference to the normal distribution in probabilistic techniques.
Berkson is also credited with the introduction of the logit model in 1944, and with coining this term. The term was borrowed by analogy from the very similar probit model developed by Chester Ittner Bliss in 1934.

Berkson was a prominent opponent of the idea that cigarette smoking causes cancer. In the 1957 Liggett & Myers annual report, he was quoted as saying "the evidence, taken as a whole, does not establish, on any reasonable scientific basis, that cigarette smoking causes lung cancer."  Following the issuance of the famous report Smoking and Health: Report of the Advisory Committee to the Surgeon General of the United States, he was quoted in Life Magazine as saying it was "very doubtful that smoking causes cancer of the lung."

Bibliography 
 Berkson J. Limitations of the Application of Fourfold Table Analysis to Hospital Data. Biometrics Bulletin. 1946;2(3):47–53. PMID 21001024.
 Berkson J. Limitations of the Application of Fourfold Table Analysis to Hospital Data. International Journal of Epidemiology. 2014;43(2):511–515. DOI: 10.1093/ije/dyu022. PMID 24585734. Reprint with restrictions.

Notes

1899 births
1982 deaths
American statisticians
Johns Hopkins University alumni
Fellows of the American Statistical Association
City College of New York alumni
Columbia University alumni
Biostatisticians